The Popular Unitary Action Movement or MAPU was a small leftist political party in Chile.  It was part of the Popular Unity coalition during the government of Salvador Allende.  MAPU was repressed during the dictatorship of Augusto Pinochet. In this period, some of its most radical members formed the Movimiento Juvenil Lautaro, whose leaders were political prisoners during the dictatorship and with the return to democracy. Another faction of the former members of the party joined the social democratic Party for Democracy in 1987.

History
MAPU was first formed as a splinter group of the Christian Democratic Party of Chile on May 19, 1969. At the time, Christian Democrats were in the government and many party members, especially among the youth, became critical of the party's policies that they regarded as pro-American and pro-imperialist. It joined the Unidad Popular coalition  of Salvador Allende and participated in his government. The party's ideological line was not clearly defined at first. In fact, the party leaders were encouraged by Allende and Fidel Castro (whom the MAPU delegation met in 1972 when visiting Cuba) not to embrace Marxism officially, since there were such parties in Chile already, and the Unidad Popular coalition wished to claim a Christian Left niche, too (the newly founded Izquierda Cristiana was considered too small).

They adhered to Marxism-Leninism, had become more radicalized and oriented themselves towards non-aligned countries. A group of politicians (Jacques Chonchol,  and Julio Silva Solar) left to join the Izquierda Cristiana. On 7 March 1973, the MAPU split into two feuding groups: one organization, led by Oscar Guillermo Garretón and Eduardo Aquevedo embraced Marxism-Leninism and militant leftist positions. This group was supported by the Socialist Party, the MIR and the Izquierda Cristiana. The other faction, led by Jaime Gazmuri and Enrique Correa criticized the former for ultraleftism and formed a new party, MAPU Obrero Campesino, that was close to PCCh and followed more moderate tactics. Both groups remained in the Unidad Popular until it was overthrown.

Presidential candidates 
The following is a list of the presidential candidates supported by the Popular Unitary Action Movement. (Information gathered from the Archive of Chilean Elections).

1970: Salvador Allende (won)
1988 plebiscite: "No" (won)
1989: Patricio Aylwin (won)
1993: Eugenio Pizarro (lost)

References

External links 
Rettig Report or The National Commission for Truth and Reconciliation Report (English Translation)

1969 establishments in Chile
1994 disestablishments in Chile
Catholicism and far-left politics
Christian socialist organizations
Defunct political parties in Chile
Political parties disestablished in 1994
Political parties established in 1969
Presidency of Salvador Allende
Socialist parties in Chile